The Dietel manuscript,  Ms. R 18, also known as the Dietel Collection and, in German, is the oldest extant manuscript with a large collection of four-part chorales by Johann Sebastian Bach. It contains 149 of Bach's chorale harmonisations (not 150 as is written on its title page) and originated around 1735.

Context
In 1727, at age 13, Johann Ludwig Dietel became a pupil of the St Thomas School in Leipzig. His oldest extant work as copyist of Johann Sebastian Bach's music dates from two years later (performance parts of BWV 120.2 and 174). By then, mid 1729, Bach had just begun his seventh year as cantor at St Thomas, and had already composed hundreds of church cantatas, the St John and St Matthew Passions, and several motets: all of these are sacred compositions mostly containing one or more four-part harmonisations of Lutheran chorale melodies, setting the text of usually one, and sometimes two, stanzas of a Lutheran hymn, to be sung by a SATB choir. Apart from these four-part chorales which are movements in larger-scale compositions, Bach also wrote such SATB settings of hymn tunes down in, for instance, the Notebook for Anna Magdalena Bach (begun 1725), and the Three Wedding Chorales manuscript (1730s). In Bach's autographs, four-part chorale harmonisations are characteristically written down with a  instrumentation and figured bass accompaniment, sometimes also with interludes connecting the phrases of the hymn or independent instrumental figuration, and more exceptionally, for instance the setting of "Dir, dir, Jehova, will ich singen", BWV 299, a chorale in Anna Magdalena's notebook as a piece exclusively for four singing voices.

In the autumn of 1729 Dietel worked on the performance parts of BWV 201, one of Bach's secular cantatas. His work on the performance material of Johann Bernhard Bach's overtures in D major (BNB I/B/4) and G major (BNB I/B/6) is from slightly later. In August 1730 Johann Sebastian ranged Dietel among those singers of the school who were fit to perform the solo parts of his church music. On New Year's Day 1731, or, less likely, a year earlier, Carl Gotthelf Gerlach performed Gehet zu seinen Toren ein mit Danken, FWV D:G1 (=FR 9/2), a church cantata for New Year by Johann Friedrich Fasch. Dietel had copied the score for this performance. Both Dietel and Gerlach, who was nearly a decade older, were born in : this, and the fact that they were distant relatives, may explain how they became close in Leipzig. Gerlach had become a student of the St Thomas school in 1716, which he still was when Bach moved into the school buildings as cantor in 1723. From 1727 Gerlach studied at Leipzig University.

In 1731 Dietel helped copy out the performance parts of two further church cantatas by Johann Sebastian Bach (BWV 112 and 29). Late 1731 or early 1732 Dietel copied the score of Bach's early church cantata BWV 196, followed, before 25 March 1732, by a copy of the score of the Gottes und Marien Kind cantata attributed to Fasch (FWV D:G3, FR 1400). From 1733 to 1734 Dietel copied performance material for three more secular cantatas by Bach (BWV 213, 214 and 215). Further manuscript copies by Dietel from around 1734:
 Organ and continuo performance parts of the Sanctus in B major, BWV Anh. 28.
 For a performance on Reformation Day 31 October 1734: score of Welt und Teufel tobt ihr noch, another cantata attributed to Fasch (FWV D:W2, FR 1401).
 A series of cantatas by Nicola Porpora, copied in collaboration with Gerlach, possibly for a performance by the latter as singer.
In 1734, or possibly 1735, Dietel copied the organ part of BWV 100, a chorale cantata by Bach. Bach presented his Christmas Oratorio, BWV 248, for the first time as a set of six cantatas, each of these performed on one of the six Feast Days and Sundays from 25 December 1734 to 6 January 1735. For two of these cantatas, those for New Year's Day (No. IV) and Epiphany (No. VI), Dietel was the main copyist of the performance material. On 30 January 1735 Bach premiered his cantata BWV 14. Likely some time after that, the closing chorale of BWV 14 being its most recent datable entry, Dietel started the manuscript named after him, which contains 149 four-part chorales copied from manuscripts with compositions by Bach. By that time Dietel belonged to the inner circle of Bach's pupils who had broad access to the composer's musical library.

Who asked Dietel to produce the chorale collection, and also, for what purpose it was penned, are questions for which the answer can not be ascertained. It would have been highly unlikely that Dietel took the initiative for the collection: copying music was generally not done without remuneration. The manuscript contained many errors and inaccuracies, none of which were corrected by Bach, something the composer would normally have done if he had commissioned this copy of his music. In 1736 Dietel started his studies at Leipzig University, and like that earlier main copyist of Bach's music, had done a decade earlier, he continued to work for the music director of the  while discontinuing to work for Bach, after the switch from St Thomas school to University.

Content
Dietel's manuscript, R 18, contains 149 SATB settings, without instrumental accompaniment or interludes, of chorale tunes. Two settings, Nos. 119 and 134, are identical, thus the collection contains 148 unique settings. A few settings are related, but not identical:
 Nos. 1 (variant of BWV 117/4) and 100 (BWV 117/4)
 Nos. 88 (BWV 8/6) and 148 (BWV deest – similar to BWV 8/6, but with a different harmonic progression)
All settings are by Bach and/or feature in larger-scale compositions by Bach. Two settings are strictly speaking not by Bach:
 No. 88 (BWV 8/6): Bach's adaptation of a SATB setting by Daniel Vetter, published in 1713.
In general, Bach based his harmonisations on pre-existing hymn tunes. There are, however, some hymn tunes (or versions thereof) for which there appear to be no earlier extant sources than Bach's compositions. In the Dietel manuscript:
 Zahn No. 3068, in R 18 No. 6 ("Dir, dir, Jehova, will ich singen")
 Zahn No. 5878a, in R 18 No. 9 ("Ich bin ja, Herr, in deiner Macht")
 Tune of BWV 1122 (not in Zahn), R 18 No. 38 ("Denket doch, ihr Menschenkinder")
 Zahn No. 7417a, in R 18 No. 48 ("Gib dich zufrieden und sei stille")
 Zahn No. 6462, in R 18 Nos. 117 and 125: Bach's adaptation of the Zahn No. 6461 hymn tune ("Warum sollt ich mich denn grämen")
 BWV 452, the Schemelli version of "Dir, dir, Jehova, will ich singen", appears to have been derived from the four-part setting BWV 299 [2] as found in R 18 No. 6;
 The four-part version of "Auf, auf, mein Herz, mit Freuden" as found in the Dietel manuscript (No. 95) appears to be an arrangement of the Schemelli version (BWV 441)
Also the R 18 No. 148 version of "Liebster Gott, wenn werd ich sterben" appears to be related to the Schemelli variant BWV 483.

Around two thirds of the settings in the Dietel manuscript can also be found in Bach's extant cantatas, motets, Passions and oratorios. Many of the chorale settings for which R 18 is the earliest extant source may derive from lost larger works, such as the St Mark Passion, BWV 247, of 1731, and several cantatas of the Picander cycle of 1728–29. However, not all four-part chorales of the Dietel collection originated in such larger works (e.g., BWV 299). Also, Bach re-used some chorale settings in several works (e.g., BWV 75/7 = BWV 100/6) so that it can't always exactly be determined from which original Dietel copied in his collection.

All chorales have a number (however with collation errors), and, except for No. 145, a title referring to a text of a Lutheran hymn, but are otherwise untexted. The titles in R 18 do not always refer to the hymns from which stanzas are extracted in musically corresponding movements of larger works. There is no over-all organisational principle for the collation, but some ranges appear to have some logic: for example, the range from Nos. 67 to 96 follows through the liturgical year, more or less consequentially, from the fourth Sunday after Trinity to the first Sunday of Advent.

Reception
When Gerlach died in Leipzig in 1761 he apparently had no heirs living in the town: a large part of his music collection, for instance the copies of the Porpora cantatas, came in the possession of the music publishers Bernhard Christoph and Johann Gottlob Immanuel Breitkopf. The earliest trace of the Dietel manuscript dates from 1764, when the Breitkopf publishing firm offered (manuscript) copies of the chorale collection for sale. The earliest prints of Bach's four-part chorale collections, two volumes published by Birnstiel in 1765 and 1769 respectively, drew from other manuscripts than the Dietel Collection. Bach's son Carl Philipp Emanuel (C. P. E.), who had collaborated on Birnstiel's 1765 volume, fell out with the publisher and left further plans for a complete edition of his father's four-part chorales to Johann Kirnberger, who negotiated with the Breitkopf firm on the subject. In 1777 Kirnberger wrote to Breitkopf:The "" (150 pieces) mentioned by Kirnberger refer to the Dietel manuscript. The library contained these manuscripts:
 D-B Am.B 46/II, Fascicle 3, containing 111 four-part chorales, all of which also occur in the Dietel collection. The fascicle is part of the Am.B 46/II collection, which contains 369 chorales, and its content likely corresponds to the collection of chorales which Kirnberger had acquired from C. P. E. Bach. The Am.B 46/II copy was likely produced in Berlin (where Kirnberger lived and worked) around the 1770s.
 D-B Am.B 48: a rather straightforward copy of the Dietel manuscript, produced in Leipzig by the Breitkopf firm, that is, the kind of copy they offered for sale in 1764, and the only extant of such copies.

When Kirnberger died in 1783, no new edition of Bach's four-part chorales had materialised. Shortly thereafter, in 1784 and 1785, Breitkopf published the first two volumes of their new edition of these chorales, edited by C. P. E. Bach. These volumes reflected, to a large extent, the two Birnstiel volumes, that is, none of the chorales contained in them were extracted from the Dietel manuscript: the chorales from that manuscript, or rather, from the Am.B 46/II, Fascicle 3, selection, were only included in the third (1786) and concluding fourth (1787) volumes of Breitkopf's edition. Within two decades after the publication, Breitkopf disposed of the Dietel manuscript,  becoming its new owner.

The Dietel manuscript only started to attract stronger attention from scholarship in the second half of the 20th century.

References

Sources

External links
 

Baroque music manuscript sources
Compositions by Johann Sebastian Bach